is a Japanese wrestler and Olympic champion in Freestyle wrestling.

Olympics
Sato competed at the 1988 Summer Olympics in Seoul where he received a gold medal in Freestyle wrestling, the flyweight class.

References

External links

1961 births
Living people
Olympic wrestlers of Japan
Wrestlers at the 1988 Summer Olympics
Wrestlers at the 1992 Summer Olympics
Japanese male sport wrestlers
Olympic gold medalists for Japan
Nippon Sport Science University alumni
Olympic medalists in wrestling
Asian Games medalists in wrestling
Wrestlers at the 1986 Asian Games
World Wrestling Championships medalists
Medalists at the 1988 Summer Olympics
Universiade medalists in wrestling
Medalists at the 1986 Asian Games
Asian Games gold medalists for Japan
Universiade gold medalists for Japan
Medalists at the 1981 Summer Universiade
20th-century Japanese people
21st-century Japanese people